Tropical Storm Debra was the second of two tropical storms to hit the United States in the 1978 Atlantic hurricane season. The fourth named storm of the season, Debra developed from the interaction between a high-altitude cold low and a lower tropical wave in the Gulf of Mexico. Forming on August 25, it was upgraded to Tropical Storm Debra based on data from a Hurricane Hunter aircraft. As Debra approached the coast, it attained peak winds of 60 mph (95 km/h). The storm made landfall on the coast of Louisiana, east of the Texas border. Two deaths were caused by the storm. Debra weakened as it moved inland and ultimately dissipated on August 29 over Arkansas.

Meteorological history 

Debra originated in an upper-level cold-core low pressure system that developed over southwestern Florida in late August 1978. The low moved southwest towards the Yucatán Peninsula over the next day, as a tropical wave drifted westwards from the Caribbean Sea.

At first the depression drifted westward but, as the western periphery of a high-pressure area weakened, it tracked towards the north and slowly strengthened. After a reconnaissance aircraft found surface winds of 45 mph (70 km/h) on August 28, the depression was upgraded to Tropical Storm Debra. The aircraft also recorded a minimum pressure of 1002 mbar (hPa; 29.59 inHg). While Debra approached the coast of Louisiana, an additional flight into the system found a drop in surface pressure to 1000 mbar (hPa; 29.53 inHg), as well as peak winds of approximately 60 mph (100 km/h) at 00:00 GMT on August 29. Observation stations off the coast recorded sustained winds of 45–50 mph (70–80 km/h) on August 28, as Debra passed  to the west.

The storm made landfall between Beaumont, Texas, and Lake Charles, Louisiana, on August 28. Two stations recorded surface pressures of 1002 mbar (hPa; (29.59 inHg)). As Debra moved north-northeast through Louisiana and Arkansas, the central pressure rose slightly. In south central Arkansas the residual low pressure system merged with a frontal trough on August 29; the frontal wave drifted into southern Illinois and traveled eastbound into the Ohio Valley for the next three days. Five tornadoes were reported from the system in Texas, Louisiana, and Mississippi shortly after Debra's landfall.

Preparations and impact

Louisiana 
A flash flood watch was issued in advance of Debra for the whole of Louisiana. ExxonMobil, Royal Dutch Shell, Chevron, and other oil companies shut down operations and evacuated about 1,000 employees from offshore oil rigs in Texas and Louisiana. Three evacuation centers in Lake Charles, were set up to help those needing shelter and departing the Cameron area, and the Red Cross opened four shelters at the Calcasieu Parish Public Schools. In Louisiana, more than six thousand people were evacuated from Cameron Parish, as well as an undetermined number from Vermilion Parish.

Louisiana had moderate flooding, especially in Rapides Parish. Flash flood warnings were issued during the storm for Louisiana, Mississippi, Arkansas, Missouri, and Tennessee. By dawn on August 29, all rainwater had receded from the streets and tides were back to normal levels.

A confirmed tornado at the Ike settlement in Vernon Parish, knocked over a trailer. The greatest amount of rainfall caused by Debra, was recorded in Freshwater Bayou Lock.

Elsewhere 
Gale warnings were prompted from Galveston, Texas, through to Grand Isle, Louisiana, at 18:00 GMT on August 28. A confirmed tornado in Hardin County, Texas, damaged a trailer home and power lines.

A tornado spawned in Turkey Creek, Mississippi, destroyed three mobile homes and a house, killing one person and seriously injuring another; this tornado tracked on to Crystal Springs, Mississippi. Many rice stands were knocked over because of the gusts of wind from Tropical Storm Debra. Tornadoes were reported in Memphis, Tennessee; Little Rock, Arkansas; Starkville, Springdale, Cedarbluff and Flora in Mississippi; Livingston and Ascension parishes and north Lafayette in Louisiana. One person was hurt in the Memphis tornado. Power was knocked out at four blocks of the Memphis International Airport, gas supplies were cut off in Memphis, and downed trees and power poles blocked many streets. Overall damage caused by Debra was minimal.

See also 

Tropical Storm Bill (2003)
Tropical Storm Beryl (1988)
Tropical Storm Barry (2001)
Tropical Storm Matthew (2004)
Tropical Storm Lee (2011)
Tropical Storm Hermine (1998)
List of wettest tropical cyclones in Illinois
List of wettest tropical cyclones in Indiana
Other storms with the same name

Notes

Footnotes

Citations

External links 
Hydrometeorological Prediction Center's archive on Tropical Storm Debra

1978 Atlantic hurricane season
Debra
Debra (1978)
Debra (1978)
Debra (1978)
Debra (1978)
Debra (1978)
Debra (1978)
Debra (1978)